The Springwell Danish Cemetery is located at 6326 Hartman Avenue in North Omaha, Nebraska. First used in 1868, this cemetery was formally established in 1889 by Danish immigrants. It was designated an Omaha Landmark in 1996.

About
The Springwell Danish Cemetery was established on a  tract of land northwest outside of Omaha.  Visitors would travel through Benson to the end of the streetcar line, and then walk to the cemetery.

The oldest grave in the cemetery belongs to Lars Jocumsen, and is marked by an obelisk that dates from 1868. Jocumsen was a farmer in the area. Among the notable Omaha Danes buried at Springwell Cemetery is Col. Sophus Neble.

See also
 Danes in Omaha, Nebraska
 List of cemeteries in Omaha
 Landmarks in Omaha, Nebraska

References

External links
 Listing of interments
 Partial cemetery photos.
 
 

Landmarks in North Omaha, Nebraska
Cemeteries in Omaha, Nebraska
History of Omaha, Nebraska
Omaha Landmarks
Danish-American culture in Omaha, Nebraska
Danish-American history
1868 establishments in Nebraska